Robert James Hodrick (born September 12, 1950), is a U.S. economist specialized in International Finance. AB, Princeton, 1972; PhD, University of Chicago, 1976. Until 1983, he served as a professor at Carnegie-Mellon University, where he worked jointly with Edward C. Prescott on business cycle, and developed the Hodrick–Prescott filter to distinguish trends from cyclical fluctuations. He taught at Northwestern University and joined Columbia University in 1996.

References

External links 
 Website at Columbia University
 

1950 births
Living people
21st-century American economists
Princeton University alumni
University of Chicago alumni
Columbia University faculty